The following is a list of current weapon systems of the South African Air Force.  For weapon system no longer in use, see List of obsolete weapon systems of the South African Air Force.

Current Systems

Footnotes

External links
Official South African Air Force website
Unofficial South African Air Force website
SAAF ejection seat history

Weapons of South Africa